Proisotominae is a subfamily of elongate-bodied springtails in the family Isotomidae. There are about 7 genera and more than 190 described species in Proisotominae.

Genera
These seven genera belong to the subfamily Proisotominae:
 Archisotoma Linnaniemi, 1912
 Ballistura Börner, 1906
 Folsomia Willem, 1902
 Folsomina Denis, 1931
 Guthriella Börner, 1906
 Proisotoma Börner, 1901
 Weberacantha Christiansen, 1951

References

Further reading

External links

 

Collembola
Articles created by Qbugbot
Arthropod families